Johan Christian Arnt Johnsen (27 January 1893 - 27 January 1927) was a Norwegian sprinter born in Oslo, Norway. He died exactly 34 years later in Oslo.

Johnsen competed at the 1920 Summer Olympics in Antwerp, Belgium in the men's 100 m for Norway. He was unable to pass through the heats phase finishing fourth in his heat of five with his time being unknown.

Johnsen's personal best in the 100 m was set in 1919, the time being 10.7 seconds. During this period he was representing IK Tjalve in Oslo.

References

1893 births
1927 deaths
Norwegian male sprinters
Athletes (track and field) at the 1920 Summer Olympics
Olympic athletes of Norway
Athletes from Oslo